Kosovo-Pomoravlje District is a district in de jure Autonomous Province of Kosovo and Metohija. The area now has a population of 217,726. Before the NATO intervention in the Kosovo War, 20.000 Serbs lived in Gnjilane. The seat of the district was in the city of Gnjilane. Along with the rest of Kosovo and Metohija, it was transferred to UN administration, a situation accepted by the Serbian government. In 2000 the UN administration renamed the district the District of Gjilan as part of a series of reforms, which were rejected by Serbia.

Municipalities

It included the municipalities of:
Kosovska Kamenica (Kamenica or Dardana)
Novo Brdo (Novobërda or Artana)
Gnjilane (Gjilan)
Vitina (Vitia)

See also
Kosovo (region)
Pomoravlje (region)

References

Districts in Kosovo and Metohija